Thrinaxodon Col is a rock col 2 nautical miles (3.7 km) southeast of Rougier Hill. The col is along the ridge that trends southward from Rougier Hill in the Cumulus Hills, Queen Maud Mountains. The name was proposed to Advisory Committee on Antarctic Names (US-ACAN) in 1971 by geologist David H. Elliot of the Ohio State University Institute of Polar Studies. The col is a very important fossil (vertebrate) locality at which several specimens of the mammal-like reptile Thrinaxodon were found.

Paleontological sites of Antarctica
Mountain passes of the Ross Dependency
Dufek Coast